Jack St. Clair Kilby (November 8, 1923 – June 20, 2005) was an American electrical engineer who took part  (along with Robert Noyce of Fairchild) in the realization of the first integrated circuit while working at Texas Instruments (TI) in 1958. He was awarded the Nobel Prize in Physics on December 10, 2000.  Kilby was also the co-inventor of the handheld calculator and the thermal printer, for which he had the patents. He also had patents for seven other inventions.

Early life 
Jack Kilby was born in 1923 in Jefferson City, Missouri to Hubert and Vina Freitag Kilby. Both parents had Bachelor of Science degrees from the University of Illinois. His father was a manager at a local utility company. Kilby grew up and attended school in Great Bend, Kansas, graduating from the Great Bend High School. (Road signs at the entrances to the town commemorate his time there, and the Commons Area at Great Bend High School has been named The Jack Kilby Commons Area.)

Kilby received his Bachelor of Science degree from the University of Illinois at Urbana–Champaign, where he was an honorary member of Acacia fraternity. In 1947, he received a degree in electrical engineering. He earned his Master of Science in electrical engineering from the University of Wisconsin–Milwaukee in 1950, while working at Centralab, a division of Globe-Union corporation in Milwaukee.

Career
In mid-1958, Kilby, a newly employed engineer at Texas Instruments (TI), did not yet have the right to a summer vacation. He spent the summer working on the problem in circuit design that was commonly called the "tyranny of numbers", and he finally came to the conclusion that the manufacturing of circuit components en masse in a single piece of semiconductor material could provide a solution. On September 12, he presented his findings to company's management, which included Mark Shepherd. He showed them a piece of germanium with an oscilloscope attached, pressed a switch, and the oscilloscope showed a continuous sine wave, proving that his integrated circuit worked, and thus that he had solved the problem. U.S. Patent 3,138,743 for "Miniaturized Electronic Circuits", the first integrated circuit, was filed on February 6, 1959. Along with Robert Noyce (who independently made a similar circuit a few months later), Kilby is generally credited as co-inventor of the integrated circuit.

Jack Kilby went on to pioneer military, industrial, and commercial applications of microchip technology. He headed teams that created the first military system and the first computer incorporating integrated circuits. He invented the handheld calculator (along with Jerry Merryman and James Van Tassel). He was also responsible for the thermal printer that was used in early portable data terminals.

In 1970, he took a leave of absence from TI to work as an independent inventor. He explored, among other subjects, the use of silicon technology for generating electrical power from sunlight. From 1978 to 1984 he held the position of Distinguished Professor of Electrical Engineering at Texas A&M University.

In 1983, Kilby retired from Texas Instruments.

Legacy

He died of cancer June 20, 2005 at the age of 81, in Dallas, Texas.

On December 14, 2005, Texas Instruments created the Historic TI Archives. The Jack Kilby family donated his personal manuscripts and his personal photograph collection to Southern Methodist University (SMU). The collection will be cataloged and stored at DeGolyer Library, SMU.

In 2008, the SMU School of Engineering, with the DeGolyer Library and the Library of Congress, hosted a year-long celebration of the 50th anniversary of the birth of the digital age with Kilby's Nobel Prize-winning invention of the integrated circuit. Symposia and exhibits examined the many ways in which technology and engineers shaped the modern world. Kilby held an honorary doctorate of science from SMU and was a longtime associate of SMU through the Kilby Foundation.

A statue of Jack Kilby stands in Texas Instruments Plaza on the campus of The University of Texas at Dallas.

Awards and honors

Recognition of Kilby's outstanding achievements have been made by the Institute of Electrical and Electronics Engineers (IEEE), including the election to IEEE Fellow in 1966, the IEEE David Sarnoff Award in 1966, co-recipient of the first IEEE Cledo Brunetti Award in 1978, the IEEE Centennial Medal in 1984 and the IEEE Medal of Honor in 1986. He was co-recipient of the Franklin Institute’s Stuart Ballantine Medal in 1966. In 1982 and 1989, he received the Holley Medal from the American Society of Mechanical Engineers (ASME). He was elected to member of the National Academy of Engineering (NAE) in 1967 and received the Academy's Vladimir K. Zworykin Award in 1975. Kilby received the Golden Plate Award of the American Academy of Achievement in 1970 and was co-recipient of the first NAE's Charles Stark Draper Prize in 1989. The Kilby Award Foundation was founded in 1980 in his honor, and the IEEE Jack S. Kilby Signal Processing Medal was created in 1995. He was elected to the American Philosophical Society in 2001.

Kilby is also the recipient of the America's most prestigious honors in science and engineering: the National Medal of Science in 1969, and the National Medal of Technology in 1990. In 1982, he was inducted into the National Inventors Hall of Fame.

In 1993, he was awarded the Kyoto Prize by the Inamori Foundation. He was awarded both the Washington Award, administered by the Western Society of Engineers and the Eta Kappa Nu Vladimir Karapetoff Award in 1999. In 2000, Kilby was awarded the Nobel Prize in Physics for his breakthrough discovery, and delivered his personal view of the industry and its history in his acceptance speech. 

Kilby was awarded nine honorary doctorate degrees from universities including Southern Methodist University, the University of Miami, University of Illinois, University of Wisconsin–Madison, Texas A&M University, Yale and Rochester Institute of Technology. The National Chiao Tung University (NCTU) in Taiwan awarded Kilby with a certificate of Honorary Professorship in 1998.

The Kilby Labs, TI's research laboratory for silicon manufacturing and integrated circuit design, is named after him.

The Jack Kilby Computer Centre at the Merchiston Campus of Edinburgh Napier University in Edinburgh is also named in his honor.

Kilby patents
  Plug-in Circuit Units, filed December 1953, issued June 1959, assigned to Globe-Union, Inc.
  Semiconductor Structure Fabrication, filed May 1959, issued January 1963
  Miniature Semiconductor Integrated Circuit, filed May 1959, issued December 1963
  Miniature Semiconductor Network Diode and Gate, filed May 1959, issued June 1964
  Miniaturized Electronic Circuits, filed February 6, 1959, issued June, 1964
  Miniaturized Self-contained Circuit Modules, filed May 1959, issued June 1964
  Semiconductor Structure Fabrication, filed May 1959, issued April 1969
  Thermal Printer, filed October 1965, issued February 1970
  Miniature Electronic Calculator, originally filed September 1967, issued June 1974

See also
 Geoffrey Dummer, the British engineer who first conceived the idea of the integrated circuit.

Notes

References
Berlin, Leslie The man behind the microchip: Robert Noyce and the invention of Silicon Valley  Publisher Oxford University Press US, 2005 
Lécuyer, Christophe. Making Silicon Valley: Innovation and the Growth of High Tech, 1930-1970 Published by MIT Press, 2006.
Nobel lectures, World Scientific Publishing Co., Singapore, 2000.

External links

 Honoring Jack Kilby website, with resource archive of articles, Kilby statue in Great Bend, KS etc.
 "Jack St. Clair Kilby: A Man of Few Words", biography by Ed Millis.
 , video presentation from Texas Instruments.
 "From concept to cosmos: How Jack Kilby's integrated circuit transformed the electronics industry", biography by Texas Instruments.
 Oral history interview with Jack S. Kilby at Charles Babbage Institute, University of Minnesota, Minneapolis.  Interview covers Kilby's entire career, including his education, work experiences at Centralab, where he worked with Alfred Khouri and Robert Wolff, and Texas Instruments (TI) under Willis Adcock.  Kilby discusses TI's development and manufacturing of integrated circuits. He discusses his involvement in the development of the first hand-held calculator at TI. Discusses semiconductor developments at Fairchild Corporation and his independent work after leaving TI in 1970.
 "Jack Kilby, Touching Lives on Micro and Macro Scales" by T.R. Reid, The Washington Post (June 2005).
 Obituary: The Economist, Jul 7th 2005]
 
  including the Nobel Lecture on 8 December 2000 Turning Potential into Reality: The Invention of the Integrated Circuit
 
 Jack S. Kilby Patents
 Inventors of the Modern Computer
 
 The Chip That Jack Built, a short film by public television station KERA profiling Kilby
 "Tribute to Jack Kilby", Dream 2047, November 2005

1923 births
2005 deaths
American inventors
People from Jefferson City, Missouri
Physicists from Missouri
Scientists from Missouri
Grainger College of Engineering alumni
University of Wisconsin–Madison College of Engineering alumni
American electronics engineers
Nobel laureates affiliated with Missouri
Nobel laureates in Physics
American Nobel laureates
IEEE Medal of Honor recipients
National Medal of Technology recipients
National Medal of Science laureates
Texas Instruments people
Deaths from cancer in Texas
Amateur radio people
Draper Prize winners
Scientists from Kansas
IEEE Centennial Medal laureates
Fellow Members of the IEEE
Members of the United States National Academy of Engineering
Kyoto laureates in Advanced Technology
Members of the American Philosophical Society